The Höch Gumme (2,205 m) is a mountain of the Emmental Alps in Switzerland. It lies to the east of the Brienzer Rothorn and Arnihaaggen, and the west of the Wilerhorn and Brünig Pass. The Schönbüel cable car station (2,011 m) is on its eastern flank.

Administratively, the summit is shared between the municipalities of Giswil, to the north-west, Lungern to the east, and Hofstetten bei Brienz, to the south. Hofstetten bei Brienz is in the canton of Bern, whilst Giswil and Lungern are in the canton of Obwalden.

References

External links
 Höch Gumme on Hikr

Mountains of the Alps
Mountains of Switzerland
Emmental Alps
Mountains of Obwalden
Mountains of the canton of Bern
Bern–Obwalden border
Two-thousanders of Switzerland